The Bloomsburg Fair has been held in Bloomsburg, Pennsylvania, since 1855 and continues to this day.

History
It was originally held as an agricultural exhibition located on the lower end of Second Street, which is now Main Street. Since then it has grown to be the largest fair in the Commonwealth of Pennsylvania.  The Bloomsburg Fair was started by Caleb Barton in 1854. The 156th Bloomsburg Fair was held from September 25 to October 2, 2010. In 2006, fair attendance for the week reached 413,203 people. The 157th Fair was scheduled to be held from September 24, 2011, to October 1, 2011, was canceled due to the 2011 Tropical Storm Lee flood. However, the fair returned in style with the 158th edition in 2012 after a one-year hiatus.  On July 28, 2020, it was announced that the fair has been cancelled for 2020 due to the COVID-19 pandemic. Besides 2011 and 2020, there were other cancellations in 1917–18 due to World War I and 1942–44 due to World War II.

The 166th Bloomsburg Fair had an attendance of 369,791 people.  The 167th Bloomsburg Fair is planned to run from PREVIEW DAY Friday, 23 September 2021 until Saturday, 1 October 2022.

Organization
The Bloomsburg Fair is run and maintained by a board of 13 directors, each in charge of a different aspect of the Fair. They are voted in by the thousands of members that hold a share in the Bloomsburg Fair during a yearly meeting. Each director has a different term length and can maintain their station as long as the shareholders allow. Any member can run for position on the board of directors as long as they have held that share for more than two years. While each director has a specific set of duties they all vote for major changes and additions that happen at the Fair Grounds.

Unique aspects
The Bloomsburg Fair is one of the last quarter-mile dirt tracks to remain open during the winter season for harness racing. While the stage and seating is limited at the Bloomsburg Fair they still have high end entertainment. Fair week entertainment has been country music dominated but they allot two of the nights for a newer rock band and a classic rock band still in the past the fair has hosted acts such as Nelly, Three Days Grace, Sugarland, Seether, Lady Antebellum, Trace Adkins, 38 Special, Lynyrd Skynyrd, Foreigner, and comedians such as Jeff Dunham and Bill Engvall.

Attractions
The fair has a variety of games, foods, shows, and contests. It has a midway with an assortment of carnival rides.

Contests
 Photography
 Canning
 Farm animals
 Baking

Entertainment
Every year, the Bloomsburg Fair's Grandstand hosts a variety of world-renowned musical artists, comedians, and general entertainment. The  horse races and demolition derby are also a popular form of entertainment at the Bloomsburg Fair. The Bloomsburg Fair also has over 1,500 food stands.

In 2006, international superstar Taylor Swift performed her first major concert at the fair.

Vendor issues
In 2016, early in the fair week, a merchant selling the Hitler Youth flag was expelled from the Fair for being a registered sex offender.

References

External links
Official site of the Bloomsburg Fair

Agricultural shows in the United States
Festivals in Pennsylvania
Recurring events established in 1855
1855 establishments in Pennsylvania